The 32 Men was an assembly of respected citizens of Copenhagen, who had the right to demand an audience before the king.
The assembly was first established in 1660.  The first assembly was characterized by  large merchants and the crown's creditors. The assembly was replaced in 1840 by the Copenhagen City Council.

References

History of Copenhagen
Copenhagen Municipality